Novosyolovka is a rural locality (a khutor) in Shekalovskoye Rural Settlement, Rossoshansky District, Voronezh Oblast, Russia. The population was 82 as of 2010.

Geography 
Novosyolovka is located 32 km southwest of Rossosh (the district's administrative centre) by road. Shekalovka is the nearest rural locality.

References 

Rural localities in Rossoshansky District